In 1952, Lake Eucha in Delaware County, Oklahoma, was created by completion of the Eucha dam on Spavinaw Creek.  The nearest town is Jay, Oklahoma.  This lake is owned by the City of Tulsa, Oklahoma and functions as additional storage and as a buffer for Lake Spavinaw, which is the principal municipal water source for Tulsa.

Description

The Cherokee community of Eucha, Oklahoma was relocated to higher ground before the dam was constructed, because the lake waters were to submerge the original townsite.

Lake Eucha is also a popular place for fishing.

W. R. Holway is credited with the design and construction of both projects.

References

Eucha
Protected areas of Delaware County, Oklahoma
Infrastructure completed in 1952
Bodies of water of Delaware County, Oklahoma